Shlomi or Shelomi can refer to:

Shlomi, Israel, a town in Israel
Shlomi (Hebrew name), the Hebrew first name, "שלומי" or "שלמי"
Shlomi Arbeitman, Israeli professional footballer
Shlomi Dolev, Israeli computer science professor
Shlomi Eyal, Israeli Olympic fencer
Shlomi Haimy, Israeli Olympic mountain cyclist
Shlomi Harush (born 1987), Israeli basketball player
Shlomi Shabat, Israeli singer
Vince Offer (BORN Offer Shlomi), Israeli-American infomercial pitchman known as "The ShamWow Guy"
Bonjour Monsieur Shlomi, Israeli film